Ana Simina Grigoriu married Kalkbrenner (born 8 May 1981 in Bucharest) is a Romanian-Canadian DJ and music producer from Toronto specializing in electronic techno music. She has lived and worked in Berlin, Germany, since 2008.

Life and career 
Grigoriu was born in Romania. During the Ceaușescu era, her parents fled to Toronto, Ontario.

In Toronto she began rapping during her time at the Earl Haig Secondary School before she found her love of electronic music. During her high school time until 2000 she also attended the private School of Liberal Arts (SOLA). Until 2004 she studied print production and marketing as well as entrepreneurship and innovation at the Ryerson University.

After she met Paul Kalkbrenner on his promotion tour for his film Berlin Calling in Toronto she moved to Berlin in summer of 2008 where she has been playing in clubs and festivals as well as building on her production skills. In 2010 she performed as the opening act for Kalkbrenner's 2010 Berlin Calling concert tour. On 24 August 2012 she published her first album. The day after, she married Paul Kalkbrenner.

Discography

Albums 
 2012: Exit City (Susumu Records)

Singles and EPs 
 2010: Mukluks & Ponytails (Sonat Records)
 2011: Nebuna Stricata (Phase Insane Records)
 2011: Project Boondocks Part 1-3 (Frequenza Records)
 2011: La Palmas (Intellectro Vibe Records, together with Imerio Vitti and Luca Vera)
 2011: Writers (Sonat Records, together with Ludovic Wendi)
 2012: Baby (Susumu Records, together with Imerio Vitti)
 2012: Kokopelli (Susumu Records)
 2016: "Nunchaku / Kubota (Kuukou Records)

References

External links 
 
 

Ableton Live users
Canadian DJs
Canadian techno musicians
Women DJs
Living people
Musicians from Bucharest
Musicians from Toronto
1981 births
Toronto Metropolitan University alumni
Romanian emigrants to Canada
21st-century women musicians
Canadian women in electronic music
Canadian expatriates in Germany